Megan Carter-Davies (born 1996) is a British orienteering competitor. She became sprint world champion at the 2022 World Orienteering Championships. This made her only the third British athlete to become world champion in an individual discipline, after Yvette Hague and Jamie Stevenson.

Carter-Davies was born in Aberystwyth, United Kingdom. She competes for the orienteering clubs Swansea Bay OC (United Kingdom) and Rajamäen Rykmentti (Finland). Carter-Davies attended the University of Bristol where she studied mathematics and was the captain of the orienteering club.  

Carter-Davies first tried orienteering at the age of eight, joining Mid-Wales Orienteering club. She has been a member of the Welsh orienteering squad.

Carter-Davies won her first medals at the World Orienteering Championships in 2022, first achieving a silver medal in the mixed sprint relay with Charlotte Ward, Ralph Street and Kris Jones. She followed this up with a silver medal in the knock-out sprint, and finally a gold medal in the sprint final, breaking Tove Alexandersson's winning streak of 11 world championship victories in a row (Alexandersson finished in sixth place).

Results

World Championship results

References

External links

1996 births
Living people
British orienteers
Female orienteers
Foot orienteers
World Orienteering Championships medalists
20th-century British women
21st-century British women